American Thermoplastic Company, or ATC, is an American manufacturer of binders and other plastics products.

ATC was founded in 1954 in Pittsburgh, Pennsylvania.

External links
 ATC - official website
 ATC history - official website

Manufacturing companies based in Pittsburgh